Ken Day is the name of:
Ken Day (cricketer) (1919–1991), English cricketer of the 1950s
Ken Day (rugby league) (1936–1998), Australian rugby league footballer of the 1960s